Jon Ander Pérez Ruiz de Garibay (born 16 January 1990), known as Jon Ander, is a Spanish professional footballer who plays as a forward for Real Unión.

Club career
Born in Vitoria-Gasteiz, Álava, Basque Country, Jon Ander finished his formation with CD Aurrerá de Vitoria, and made his senior debut in the 2009–10 season, in the regional leagues. In 2013, he moved to fellow fifth division CD Vitoria before returning to Aurrerá the following year.

On 30 June 2017, after a one-season spell at SD Beasain, Jon Ander signed for Segunda División B side SD Amorebieta. Roughly one year later, he moved to fellow league team Racing de Santander on a three-year deal.

Jon Ander contributed with ten goals in 28 appearances, as his side achieved promotion to Segunda División, but spent the latter months of the competition nursing a knee injury. He returned to action in late October 2019, and made his professional debut on 2 November of that year by coming on as a late substitute for Álvaro Cejudo in a 0–1 away loss against AD Alcorcón.

References

External links
 
 
 

1990 births
Living people
Footballers from Vitoria-Gasteiz
Spanish footballers
Association football forwards
Segunda División players
Primera Federación players
Segunda División B players
Tercera División players
Divisiones Regionales de Fútbol players
CD Aurrerá de Vitoria footballers
CD Vitoria footballers
SD Beasain footballers
SD Amorebieta footballers
Racing de Santander players
SD Logroñés players
Real Unión footballers